Şeref is a Turkish name and may refer to:

Given name
 Şeref Eroğlu (born 1975), Turkish wrestler
 Şeref Has (born 1936), Turkish footballer
 Şeref Taşlıova (1938–2014), Turkish storyteller
 Şeref Görkey (1913–2004), Turkish footballer
 Şeref Osmanoğlu (born 1989)
 Şeref Tüfenk (born 1983), Turkish Olympic wrestler

Other uses
 Şeref Stadium, was a football stadium in Beşiktaş, İstanbul

Turkish masculine given names